Evangelismos is a metro station located on Vasilissis Sofias Avenue. It is in Evangelismos area, close to Evangelismos Hospital, the National Gallery of Athens, the Athens War Museum, the Byzantine & Christian Museum and the Athens Hilton. The station serves both Kolonaki and Pangrati neighbourhoods, known for their cultural hubs, shopping centers and cafes. Furthermore, many embassies and companies are located within close proximity.

This station was inaugurated in 2000 as part of the original Athens Metro section.

History
The station first appeared in the original 1979 plan as part of Line B (which is essentially the current Line 3) with the name Ilisia. It appeared as Evangelismos in the plan that was funded in 1991 and opened in 28 January 2000 along with the first section of the system. In 2019 there was a proposal for the station to change its name to Pavlos Bakoyiannis. This proposal was later dropped after facing strong opposition. (Pavlos Bakoyiannis was the brother-in-law of the then newly-elected prime minister Kyriakos Mitsotakis).

Entrances
The station has two entrances. One on Vassilissis Sofias Avenue, near Marasli Street in front of Evangelismos Hospital, and one in the middle of Rizari Park. The second entrance is linked with Vassilissis Sofias Ave. via stairway. Only the entrance at Rizari Park is ADA accessible.

Station layout

Art works
 Chryssa's abstract sculpture, Mott Street, is at the concourse level.

Gallery

References

External links
ATHENS METRO - EVANGELISMOS METRO STATION 

Athens Metro stations
Railway stations opened in 2000
2000 establishments in Greece